Denis Joseph Foreman (1 February 1933 – 23 July 2016) was a South African cricketer and footballer.

Foreman played cricket for Sussex from 1952 to 1967. He appeared in 130 first-class matches as a right-handed batsman who bowled occasional off-breaks. He scored 3,277 runs with a highest score of 104 against Nottinghamshire in 1967.

He also played 212 matches for Brighton and Hove Albion between 1953 and 1962, scoring 63 goals as an inside forward.

Denis joined the staff at Shoreham Grammar School in 1974 where he was an inspirational PE teacher until 1995.

References

External links
 Denis Foreman at CricketArchive
 Denis Foreman at Cricinfo
 Denis Foreman the forerunner by Scyld Berry in The Daily Telegraph
 Denis Foreman remembered at Shoreham College
 
 

1933 births
2016 deaths
Sportspeople from Cape Town
South African cricketers
South African soccer players
Association football forwards
English Football League players
Brighton & Hove Albion F.C. players
Hastings United F.C. (1948) players
Sussex cricketers
Western Province cricketers
Commonwealth XI cricketers